Institute on Governance (IOG) is a Canadian think-tank focused on developing better governance in the public sphere both in Canada and internationally. 

IOG is headquartered in Ottawa with a second office in Toronto and extensive operations in Iraq. It has roughly 40 staff and the current president is Toby Fyfe. The IOG publishes policy documents and briefs on civil society, democracy, good governance, political systems and forms of government, politics and society.

History
The IOG was founded in 1990 in Ottawa by Timothy Plumptre who acted as director and president until 2006. Its budget was C$1.5 million and it counted 18 staff (11 research, 7 administrative/support, 1 visiting) in 2003. 

Maryantonett Flumian served as IOG president between 2008 and 2018, during which time the IOG more than doubled in size. This period also saw the IOG expand beyond its traditional focus in the national capital area into projects in Nova Scotia, Ontario, British Columbia and Nunavut as well as multiple oversees projects, including a multi-year project in Iraq.

References

External links 
 Homepage of the Institute on Governance

Non-profit organizations based in Ottawa
Political science organizations
Government in Canada
Political and economic think tanks based in Canada
1990 establishments in Canada
Organizations established in 1990